Alcott House in Ham, Surrey (now in the London Borough of Richmond upon Thames), was the home of a utopian spiritual community and progressive school which lasted from 1838 to 1848. Supporters of Alcott House, or the Concordium, were a key group involved in the formation of the Vegetarian Society in 1847.

History and ideology
The prime mover behind the community was "sacred socialist" and mystic James Pierrepont Greaves, who was influenced by American transcendentalist Amos Bronson Alcott, and Swiss educational reformer Johann Heinrich Pestalozzi. Together with his followers, who included Charles Lane – and with the help of wealthy sponsors, Sophia and Georgiana Chichester – he founded Alcott House on Ham Common in Surrey in 1838. The Ham Common Concordium, as it came to be known, consisted of a working mixed cooperative community and a progressive school for children. The headmaster of Alcott House was Henry Gardiner Wright.

The community was dedicated to a regime of spiritual development and purification – in the words of Greaves, aiming to produce the "most loveful, intelligent and efficient conditions for divine progress in humanity". To this end the members submitted to an austere regime of early rising, strict vegetarianism (usually raw food), no stimulants, celibacy, and simple living, and experimented with various practices such as astrology, hydrotherapy, mesmerism and phrenology. The men grew their hair and beards long and wore loose-fitting clothes, while the women defied convention by not wearing the traditional, restrictive corset.

The community at Alcott House promoted a strict vegan diet, all meals were served cold apart from hot potatoes. Alcott House rejected all animal source foods including meat, butter, cheese, eggs and all stimulants such as chocolate, coffee, tea as well as mustard, salt, vinegar and spices. 

Alcott House school was open to children from both inside and outside the community – the latter usually from radical parents who sympathised with its progressive educational stance. The curriculum emphasised  moral education and the development of the child's innate spiritual gifts, teaching practical skills such as gardening and cookery as well as book learning. Punishment was frowned upon and education aimed to produce "integral men and women", able to live in a truly cooperative society and not simply playing traditional roles.

In 1848, the community came to an end and the house was purchased by John Minter Morgan to provide an orphanage, though still run along vegetarian lines. 

In 1856 the foundation stone was laid of a new building on the site, South Lodge, which exists to this day. South Lodge has been converted to flats and the grounds have been developed as Bishops Close.

British and Foreign Society for the Promotion of Humanity and Abstinence from Animal Food

The British and Foreign Society for the Promotion of Humanity and Abstinence from Animal Food was formed at Alcott House by a group of vegetarians in 1843. Unlike other organizations during this time, the Society had an open membership for women and let them hold office. The Society has been described as a forerunner to the Vegetarian Society. Its President was Sophia Chichester.

See also
Fruitlands

References

Sources
The New Age, and Concordium Gazette (pub. W. Strange, 1845), the journal of the Ham Common Concordium

Further reading

 – especially chapter 11.

19th century in England
1838 establishments in England
1848 disestablishments in England
Intentional communities in the United Kingdom
Defunct schools in the London Borough of Richmond upon Thames
Educational institutions disestablished in 1848
Educational institutions established in 1838
Former houses in the London Borough of Richmond upon Thames
Ham, London
History of the London Borough of Richmond upon Thames
Utopian communities
Veganism
Vegetarian communities
Vegetarianism in the United Kingdom